Love in a Wood is a 1915 British silent comedy film directed by Maurice Elvey and starring Gerald Ames, Elisabeth Risdon and Kenelm Foss. The film is a contemporary-set version of William Shakespeare's play As You Like It.

Cast
 Gerald Ames as Orlando 
 Vera Cuningham as Celia  
 Kenelm Foss as Oliver 
 Cyril Percival
 Elisabeth Risdon as Rosalind  
 Frank Stanmore as Touchstone  
 Dolly Tree

References

Bibliography
 Murphy, Robert. Directors in British and Irish Cinema: A Reference Companion. British Film Institute, 2006.

External links
 

1915 films
British comedy films
British silent feature films
1910s English-language films
Films directed by Maurice Elvey
1915 comedy films
British films based on plays
British black-and-white films
1910s British films
Silent comedy films